The Swiss Academies of Arts and Sciences is a Swiss organization that supports and networks the sciences at a regional, national and international level. They are designated by the Federal Act to Promote Research and Innovation to promote research together with the Swiss National Science Foundation.

The Swiss Academies of Arts and Sciences is an association of four distinct Swiss academies of different kinds:
 Swiss Academy of Natural Sciences (SCNAT);
 Swiss Academy of Medical Sciences (SAMW);
 Swiss Academy of Humanities and Social Sciences (SAGW);
 Swiss Academy of Engineering Sciences (SATW).

Overview
The two Centres for Excellence TA-SWISS and Fondation Science et Cité are also member of the Swiss Academies of Arts and Sciences.

Forums and platforms allow the Academy to adopt an interdisciplinary approach to various topics, and to strengthen the disciplinary national and international network. The Academy also coordinates the sciences among the universities in Switzerland, while cooperating with institutions for the promotion of research, such as the Swiss National Science Foundation. At a regional level, too, scientific topics are brought to the attention of a large public. This task has been assumed by the cantonal and regional associations, which organise lecture series supported by the Academy and produce publications.

Main activities
 Foresight of socially relevant topics
 Raising awareness of the ethical responsibility of the sciences
 Promoting a balanced dialogue between science and society.

Foresight
The earlier, the better. This especially applies if topics are to be identified that are of major significance for the future of society and the environment. The Academy’s activities in this respect include operating scientific monitoring systems (glaciers, Permos, etc.) and providing platforms for socially relevant topics (forums). But also new technologies that are being developed, such as nanotechnology, biotechnology, synthetic biology, etc., represent challenges for the sciences. Here, it is crucial to scientifically determine the consequences so as to be able to take advantage of the opportunities and minimise the risks. Promoted by the Academy, exchange within and among the sciences ensures a broad basis for the early detection of socially relevant problems.

Ethical responsibility
Knowing that representatives of science adhere to ethical rules bolsters society’s trust in science. And this is what makes future-oriented research possible in the first place. Therefore, it is important that scientists take ethical matters of concern seriously, because research always has an ethical dimension as well. Awareness of this can be raised among both researchers and society by providing ethical guidelines to be applied in research work. Such guidelines are drawn up by the Academy, in conjunction with researchers.

The Swiss Academies of Arts and Sciences produced brochures of guidelines and recommendations such as "Ethical principles and guidelines on animal testing", "Authorship in scientific publications – analysis and recommendations", "Scientific policy advice – recommendations" and "Scientific integrity - principles and procedural rules".

Dialogue between sciences and society
We encounter a great many applications of sciences in everyday life. We may want to know more about them but technical terminology often prevents a true dialogue. Therefore, it is important that scientific topics are carried into society and communicated in easy-to-understand language. It is equally important, however, for science to inquire about the needs of society and to take them up, either by responding to questions and concerns raised by politics or by providing the media with information. The dialogue between science and society is to allow for open, critical communication from both sides. Among other things, the Academy encourages this dialogue by means of information and events highlighting new fields of research, by supporting regional projects and by awarding prizes for outstanding scientific communication or for exhibitions on nature and the sciences.

See also
 Research magazine Horizons
 Science and technology in Switzerland
 Swiss National Science Foundation
 Swiss Meteorological Society
 Life Sciences Switzerland

Notes and references

External links
 Official website

Switzerland
Switzerland
Science and technology in Switzerland
Scientific organisations based in Switzerland
Members of the International Council for Science
Members of the International Science Council